Amos Bulus Kilawangs (born ) is a Nigerian politician. He is the Senator Representing Gombe South Senatorial District He was elected during the February 2019 Nigerian general elections under the platform of the All Progressives Congress (APC). He is also the Vice Chairman at the Delta Committee from June 2019 till June 2023.

Career 
In 2017, as a senior officer in the Nigerian Air Force he was promoted from being a group Captain to being the Air commodore along with 27 others.

To ensure operational efficiency and effectiveness, the Nigerian Air Force redeployed Air Commodore Amos Bulus, as Director of Information Technology, HQ NAF.

References

Category: Nigerian politics

Living people
All Progressives Congress politicians
1960 births
1961 births